Elizabeth Robinson Koch (born 1976) is an American publisher, writer, and entrepreneur. She has published work for One Story, Columbia Journalism Review, the Los Angeles Review of Books, The New York Observer, and other publications.

Biography 
Koch is the daughter of American billionaire businessman Charles Koch and Liz Koch. She has a brother, Chase Koch. Koch grew up in Wichita, Kansas and is a graduate of Wichita Collegiate School.  She earned a B.A. in English Literature from Princeton University and an M.F.A. in fiction from Syracuse University.

Koch was the editor of Opium Magazine. She is the cofounder of the Literary Death Match reading series, Black Balloon Publishing and publisher Catapult; the latter was founded in September 2015.   She's the founder of New Balloon, a media company that co-produced the 2015 film Beasts of No Nation.

Koch founded two nonprofit organizations: 'Unlikely Collaborators', focused on self-investigation, and Tiny Blue Dot consciousness research foundation.

Personal 
Koch lives in the greater Los Angeles area with her husband, Jason Kakoyiannis, an attorney who founded Bioscentric in 2013.

Koch states that she is "apolitical."

References 

American publishers (people)
Elizabeth
Living people
1976 births
Princeton University alumni
Syracuse University alumni
American writers